Glennon is an Irish surname and given name. It is an anglicized form of the Gaelic Patronymic name Mag Leannáin, meaning "son of Leannán." The root word of this name is "leann," meaning "cloak." The surname was first found in Leinster, where they held a family seat from ancient times.

Surname
 Anthony Glennon (born 1999), English footballer
 Bert Glennon (1893–1967), American cinematographer and film director, father of James Glennon
 Davey Glennon, Irish hurler
 David Glennon (Irish Gaelic footballer, brother of Denis Glennon
 Denis Glennon, Irish Gaelic footballer
 Frank Glennon, Irish soccer player in the 1940s
 James Glennon (1942–2006), American cinematographer
 James H. Glennon (1857–1940), United States Navy rear admiral
 Jim Glennon (born 1953), Irish former politician and former rugby player
 John Alan Glennon (born 1970), American geographer and explorer
 John J. Glennon (1862–1946), Roman Catholic Archbishop of the Archdiocese of Saint Louis, from 1903 to his death
 Matt Glennon (born 1978), English former footballer
 Michael Charles Glennon (c. 1944–2014), Australian Roman Catholic priest and convicted child molester
 Mike Glennon, American football quarterback
 Pat Glennon (1927–2004), Australian jockey
 Paul Glennon, 21st century Canadian writer
 Sean Glennon (born 1985), American football quarterback
 Patrick David Glennon (born 1970), Barrister and lecturer in law

Given name
 Glennon Doyle Melton (born 1976), American author, activist and philanthropist
 Glennon Engleman (1927–1999), American professional assassin and dentist